is a Japanese surname. Notable people with the surname include:

Hiroto Hirashima (1910–2007), Japanese-American bowler and activist
, Japanese gymnast
, Japanese rugby union player

See also
Hirajima, a surname written with the same characters
Hirashima-class minelayer, a class of Japanese naval vessels used during World War II
Tairajima, an island in Kagoshima Prefecture whose name is written with the same characters

Japanese-language surnames